Pedicularis flammea is a species of flowering plant belonging to the family Orobanchaceae.

Its native range is Subarctic America to Eastern Canada, Northern Europe.

References

flammea